PDP may refer to:

Computing and technology
 Packet Data Protocol in wireless GPRS/HSDPA networks
 Parallel distributed processing in connectionism
 Plasma display panel
 Policy Decision Point in the Common Open Policy Service
 Portable DVD player
 Power-delay product, the product of power consumption times the input–output delay
 Power delay profile, signal intensity as a function of time delay
 Primary Data Point in the RRDtool
 Programmed Data Processor, Digital Equipment Corporation (DEC) minicomputers
 PDP-1, 1959
 PDP-6, 1963
 PDP-8
 PDP-10, mainframe computer 1966-1980s
 PDP-11, 16-bit minicomputers
 Project Detail Page on Microsoft Project Server
 XACML PDP (policy decision point)

Politics
 PDP–Laban, a major political party in the Philippines rooted from the merger of the PDP and LABAN parties
 Jammu and Kashmir Peoples Democratic Party, a political party in Indian state of Jammu and Kashmir
 Islamic Party (Egypt), formerly the Peace and Development Party, Egypt
 Party for Democratic Prosperity, Republic of Macedonia
 Peace and Development Party, Mogadishu, Somalia
 People's Democratic Party (disambiguation), any of a number of worldwide political parties
 Popular Democratic Party (disambiguation), any of a number of worldwide political parties
 Progressive Democratic Party (disambiguation), a number of worldwide political parties
 Papua Presidium Council, a West Papuan political organization
 Party of Democratic Progress, Bosnia and Herzegovina
 Post-detection policy, a Post-Detection Protocol about extraterrestrial life

Other
 IATA code for Capitán de Corbeta Carlos A. Curbelo International Airport, near Punta del Este, Uruguay
 Pacific Drums and Percussion, a manufacturer
 Personal development plan
 Plastic Disclosure Project, to reduce the environmental impact of plastic
 Prescription Drug Plan in US Medicare
Walther PDP, a pistol